Skaneateles Aerodrome  is a privately owned, public use airport located two nautical miles (4 km) southwest of Skaneateles, a village the Town of Skaneateles, Onondaga County, New York, United States. It is included in the National Plan of Integrated Airport Systems for 2011–2015, which categorized it as a general aviation facility.

Facilities and aircraft 
Skaneateles Aerodrome covers an area of 100 acres (40 ha) at an elevation of 1,038 feet (316 m) above mean sea level. It has two runways: 10/28 is 3,134 by 58 feet (955 x 18 m) with an asphalt surface and 4/22 is 3,350 by 130 feet (1,021 x 40 m) with a turf surface.

For the 12-month period ending November 25, 2009, the airport had 9,108 aircraft operations, an average of 24 per day: 99.9% general aviation and <1% military. At that time there were 15 aircraft based at this airport: 93% single-engine and 7% multi-engine.

References

External links 
 Skaneateles Aerodrome, official site
 Skaneateles (6B9) at NYSDOT Airport Directory
 Aerial image as of April 1995 from USGS The National Map
 
 

Airports in New York (state)
Transportation in Onondaga County, New York